The Young European Strings (YES) School of Music is located in Dublin, Ireland and specialises in the early development and training of young professional musicians. The YES School of Music provides tuition for the violin, viola, cello and double bass. The Young European Strings Chamber Orchestra (YESCO) has performed throughout Europe and has released three albums to date.

History 

Young European Strings was established in 1988 by Hungarian-born viola player Maria Kelemen. Kelemen’s grandmother, pianist Emilia Schoffan, founded the first private music school in Budapest in the early twentieth century. Kelemen left Hungary in 1956 to study at the Brussels and Liège Royal Music Conservatories and began her professional career at the age of twenty as the leader of the viola section in the Netherlands Philharmonic Orchestra where she remained until 1984. Kelemen moved to Ireland in 1987 and founded Young European Strings a year later to develop the music potential of young children from the age of two and a half years, integrating her own methods  with the Kodály Approach.

Teaching Method 

The YES School of Music employs a teaching method called the Kodály Method, a child-centred approach based on developing the inner ear that stimulates the curiosity and imagination of very young children through the singing voice and game playing, fostering in students not only the ability to play an instrument, but learning and life-development skills in general. Maria Kelemen emphasises ‘a personal and even physical experience of music’ in her teaching methods, integrating the parts of Kodály’s philosophy that she believes in, specifically, ‘his priority of making children hear the notes they are singing or playing in their heads.’

Examinations 

Students of the YES School of Music are annually presented in graded practical (instrumental) and theory examinations before ABRSM (Associated Board of Royal Schools of Music).

Orchestras 

The orchestras of the YES School of Music comprise the Junior Orchestra (4 to 6 year olds), the Intermediate Orchestra (6 to 14 year olds), and the Young European Strings Chamber Orchestra (YESCO) under the direction of Professor Ronald Masin.
YESCO made their international debut with a concert tour of Finland in January 2001. In 2006, YESCO won the Achievement Award from the Irish Association of Youth Orchestras (IAYO) and, in 2009, won first prize in the 'Orchestras' category in the international festival ‘Jugend & Musik in Wien’. In 2014, YESCO will perform at the National Concert Hall in Dublin.
The YES Chamber Orchestra has to date released three albums: the first, a self-titled album, in November 2003 featured music by Tchaikovsky and Grieg, amongst other compositions for strings. The second album, The Marino Suite (2006), was a collaboration between YESCO and John Sheahan of The Dubliners, including arrangements of Sheahan's melodies by renowned Irish composer Raymond Deane. The most recent release, Third Edition (2012), includes music by Mahler, Mozart, Tchaikovsky, and the world premiere of the 'Five Piece Suite' by Raymond Deane.

Teachers 

Professor Ronald Masin joined YES as Artistic Director in 2002 from the DIT Conservatory of Music and Drama and instructs students in the Senior Programme at the School. Maria Kelemen and violist Tanya Plavans provide instruction in violin and viola for children up to the age of 11 and the teaching faculty also includes cellist Martin Johnson, Section Leader with the RTÉ National Symphony Orchestra, cellist Eoin Quinlan and double bass player Mark Jenkins, Associate Principal with the RTÉ National Symphony Orchestra.

Notable alumni 

Past students of the YES School of Music include Gwendolyn Masin, violinist, author and director of the GAIA Chamber Music Festival; violinists Catherine Leonard and Gina McGuinness; Martia Malherbe, violist with the Cape Philharmonic Orchestra and Niall O’Briain, Director of Newpark Music School.

Notes and references

External links 
Young European Strings School of Music website
Violin Technique: The Natural Way by Maria Kelemen and Ronald Masin

Classical music in Ireland
Leinster
Music schools in the Republic of Ireland
Pan-European music organizations